Vi smyger på Enok is a 1985 Viveca Sundvall children's book in the Mimmi series. Written as a diary, it is set between 19 August-26 December the year Mimm goes in the second grade. Together with En ettas dagbok and Roberta Karlsson och kungen they were later all released in a collection called "Mimmis bok".

For the book, Viveca Sundvall was awarded the Astrid Lindgren Prize in 1985.

Plot
Mimmi and Roberta sneak on Enok, a man who is almost 60 years old and runs a shoe store. The girls later decide to "adopt" him as a "grandfather". The book is more serious as the previous, as Enok later gets ill and dies. Mimmi and Roberta later hold an own memorial service for him instead of attending the ordinary funeral.

References

Mimmis bok, Viveca Sundvall, Rabén & Sjögren, 1986

1985 children's books
Works by Viveca Lärn
1985 Swedish novels
Fictional diaries